The 1934–35 SK Rapid Wien season was the 37th season in club history.

Squad

Squad and statistics

Squad statistics

Fixtures and results

League

Cup

Mitropa Cup

References

1934-35 Rapid Wien Season
Rapid
Austrian football championship-winning seasons